Umm al Namil(Translation: Mother of ants) is an island belonging to Kuwait, located within Kuwait Bay, in Persian Gulf.

The island is known to be the site of several archeological finds, mainly from the ancient Islamic era, Dilmun civilization, Hellenistic (including Seleucid), and the Bronze Age.

See also
 H3 (Kuwait)
 Bahra 1
 Ikaros (Failaka Island)
 Kazma
 Failaka Island
 Agarum
 Shuwaikh Island
 Subiya, Kuwait
 List of lighthouses in Kuwait

References

Islands of Kuwait
Lighthouses in Kuwait
Archaeological sites in Kuwait
History of Kuwait